Edson Enrique Torres Ulloa (born 30 July 1998) is a Mexican professional footballer who plays as a midfielder.

Club career

Guadalajara
Torres made his professional debut as a starter on 26 July 2016 in the Copa MX against Chiapas F.C. and scored his first goal. He made his Liga MX debut coming in as a substitute for Isaac Brizuela on 6 August 2016 in a match against Querétaro.

Honours
Guadalajara
Liga MX: Clausura 2017
Copa MX: Clausura 2017
CONCACAF Champions League: 2018

References

External links
 
 

1998 births
Living people
Mexican footballers
Mexican expatriate footballers
Liga MX players
Ascenso MX players
Segunda División B players
C.D. Guadalajara footballers
Lobos BUAP footballers
CD Tudelano footballers
Club Atlético Zacatepec players
Association football midfielders
Footballers from Jalisco
Mexican expatriate sportspeople in Spain
Expatriate footballers in Spain